Thomas Cadwalader (1707–1779) was an American physician in Philadelphia, Pennsylvania. After studying medicine with his uncle Dr. Evan Jones, he traveled to London, where he was an understudy of English surgeon William Cheselden. In France, he likely attended lectures at Rheims University. He lived for a while near Trenton, New Jersey, where he became the chief burgess in 1746. After returning to Philadelphia, he was elected in 1751 to the city's Common Council. He served on Pennsylvania's Provincial Council from 1755 until the Revolution. He was one of the founders of the Pennsylvania Hospital in 1751. 

Dr. Cadwalader was one of the first to inoculate patients against smallpox He was a founder and director of the Library Company of Philadelphia, and a member of the American Philosophical Society, where he served as vice president from 1769 to 1770.

His sons John and Lambert were active in the American Revolutionary War.

Cadwalader Park, in Trenton, New Jersey, was named in his family's honor.

References

Further reading
 
 The Cadwalader Family Papers, documenting the Cadwalader family through four generations in America, are available for research use at the Historical Society of Pennsylvania.

1708 births
1779 deaths
Members of the Pennsylvania Provincial Council
American people of Welsh descent
University of Pennsylvania people
Physicians from Philadelphia
People from Trenton, New Jersey
18th-century American physicians
Members of the American Philosophical Society
People of colonial New Jersey
People of colonial Pennsylvania
Physicians from New Jersey